Milton Denis Morin (October 15, 1942 – July 9, 2010) was an American professional football player who was a tight end in the National Football League (NFL). Morin attended St. Bernard's High School in Fitchburg, Massachusetts, where he held records in track and field and was elected co-captain of the football team. He also attended Brewster Academy in Wolfeboro, NH before college. After college at the University of Massachusetts, where he was a member of the Kappa Sigma fraternity, he played for the Cleveland Browns for ten seasons (1966–1975). Morin was drafted in the first round of the 1966 NFL Draft, the first-ever UMass first-round draft pick.
He was voted to the Pro Bowl in 1968 and 1971. 
After he made the team, team owner Art Modell called him into his office and asked Morin what salary he would have made if he became a school teacher; Morin's major was education. He told Modell that $6,000 was the salary. Modell told him that he would pay Morin $6,000 a year as tight end.

On May 11, 2010, Morin was elected into the College Football Hall of Fame.  On July 9, 2010, he died at Cooley Dickinson Hospital in Northampton, Massachusetts of a heart attack. His induction into the College Football Hall of Fame was scheduled for the following week.

References

1942 births
2010 deaths
American football tight ends
Cleveland Browns players
UMass Minutemen football players
American Conference Pro Bowl players
Eastern Conference Pro Bowl players
College Football Hall of Fame inductees
Sportspeople from Fitchburg, Massachusetts
People from Leominster, Massachusetts
Sportspeople from Worcester County, Massachusetts
Players of American football from Massachusetts
Brewster Academy alumni